The Whitefish River is a  southward-flowing stream originating at the outlet of Whitefish Lake. The river is a tributary of the Stillwater River just before it reaches the Flathead River in Flathead County, in the U.S. state of Montana. The Whitefish River is part of the Columbia River basin, as the Flathead River is a tributary of Clark Fork, which is tributary to the Pend Oreille River, which is tributary to the Columbia River.

History
Whitefish River and Whitefish Lake were named in the 1850s for the abundant whitefish harvested there. The Salish called them epɫx̣ʷy̓u, "has whitefish".

Course
The Whitefish River has three tributaries of significance.

Ecology
The Montana Department of Environmental Quality (DEQ) determined in 2014 that the Whitefish River was temperature-impaired, meaning that high temperature impairs aquatic life and that a reduction in water temperature of 0.99 °F was recommended.

Bull trout (Salvelinus confluentus) and westslope cutthroat trout (Oncorhynchus clarki lewisi) are considers indicator species of stream health, and are present in the Whitefish River, although in greatly diminished numbers. The primary threat to native cutthroat trout is hybridization with non-native rainbow trout (Oncorhynchus mykiss). A 2001 genetics study of cutthroat trout in the river showed 98.2% rainbow trout and 1.8% westslope cutthroat trout genetics in a sample of 15 fish. Other native fish species include the river's namesake mountain whitefish (Prosopium williamsoni), largescale sucker ((Catostomus macrocheilus)), longnose sucker ((Catostomus catostomus)), northern pikeminnow ((Ptychocheilus oregonensis)), peamouth chub (Mylocheilus caurinus,), redside shiner ((Richardsonius balteatus)), and slimy sculpin (Cottus cognatus). Non-native fish species include northern pike (Esox lucius) which preys on native trout species.

See also

Whitefish Lake
Montana Stream Access Law
List of rivers of Montana
Tributaries of the Columbia River

References

External links
 Whitefish Lake Institute

Rivers of Montana
Tributaries of the Columbia River
Rivers of Flathead County, Montana